The 2004 Pitch and Putt World Cup was held in Chia, Italy, being the first time for this championship promoted by the Federation of International Pitch and Putt Associations (FIPPA), with 8 national teams in competition. Catalonia won this World Cup.

Qualifying round

Final rounds

Final standings

See also
Pitch and Putt World Cup

External links
 FIPPA Federation of International Pitch and Putt Associations

Pitch and putt competitions